Probithia obstataria is a moth of the family Geometridae first described by Francis Walker in 1861. It is found in Sri Lanka and Australia.

Antennae of male weakly bipectinate (comb like on both sides). Irregular and oblique postmedial of the forewing diffuse grey. Discal spots found in medial fasciae of both wings.

References

Moths of Asia
Moths described in 1861